Darren Jake Till (born 24 December 1992) is an English professional mixed martial artist and former Muay Thai fighter. He competed in the Ultimate Fighting Championship (UFC), where he fought in both the welterweight and middleweight divisions, and challenged for the UFC Welterweight Championship in September 2018.

Early life
Till was born in Liverpool, where he would frequently get into altercations. He began training in Muay Thai at the age of 12. He dropped out of high school at the age of 14 to focus on the sport, turning professional a year later and beginning to train in MMA with Team Kaobon at the age of 17. During his teenage years, he would live in different places such as his gym and relatives' houses after an incident he had with his mother which got him kicked out of the family home. In August 2012, he was stabbed twice in the back after confronting a large group of men at a party. The knife missed his main artery by 1 mm, with doctors calling him lucky to be alive.

Following the incident, Till's coach Colin Heron advised him to move to Brazil to train with a former Team Kaobon coach to avoid troubles in his hometown. He subsequently joined Astra Fight Team in Balneário Camboriú, despite being unable to speak Portuguese and with minimal knowledge of grappling. While he planned to spend six months in South America, he stayed for three and a half years and welcomed a daughter with his girlfriend in Brazil. In late 2016, he returned to England to be reunited with Heron at Team Kaobon. His daughter and then-girlfriend remained in Brazil; in 2018, he revealed he had not seen his daughter for over a year.

Mixed martial arts career

Early career
Till spent most of his early MMA career in Brazil under the guidance of Astra Fight Team. He went 3–0 as an amateur in England before making the move to South America, and turned professional in February 2013. Till had 11 fights in Brazil and one in Argentina prior to joining the UFC, with just two going to a decision. In 2013, he fought eight times as a middleweight before competing at welterweight in late 2014.

Ultimate Fighting Championship

2015
Till faced Brazilian Wendell de Oliveira Marques in his UFC debut on nine days' notice at UFC Fight Night 67 on 30 May 2015. He knocked out Oliveira and secured his first UFC win.

Till next faced Nicolas Dalby on 24 October 2015 at UFC Fight Night 76. After a back and forth fight, the bout was scored a majority draw. Both participants were awarded the Fight of the Night bonus.

2017
After a significant shoulder injury and various personal issues kept him out of action for an extended period of time, Till returned to face Jessin Ayari on 28 May 2017 at UFC Fight Night 109. He missed the non-title Welterweight limit of 171 pounds by 5 pounds, and had to give 20 percent of his fight earnings to his opponent. Till won the fight via unanimous decision.

On 1 August 2017, Till announced that he had signed a new, five-fight deal with the UFC.

Till faced Bojan Veličković on 2 September 2017 at UFC Fight Night 115. Till won the fight via unanimous decision.

Till faced Donald Cerrone on 21 October 2017 at UFC Fight Night 118. He won the fight via TKO in the first round. This win earned him the Performance of the Night bonus award.

2018
Till faced former UFC Welterweight title challenger Stephen Thompson at UFC Fight Night 130 on 27 May 2018. At the weigh-ins, Till weighed in at 174.5 pounds, 3.5 pounds over the Welterweight non-title fight limit of 171. After negotiating with Thompson's team, the bout proceeded at a catchweight with the stipulation that Till could not weigh more than 188 pounds on the day of the fight. Till also forfeited 30 percent of his purse to Thompson. Till won the fight via a controversial unanimous decision. 22 of 25 media outlets scored the bout in favor of Thompson.

Till was given the opportunity to face Tyron Woodley on 8 September 2018 at UFC 228, challenging him for the UFC Welterweight Championship.
He lost the fight via D'Arce choke submission in the second round. This was Till's first loss in his MMA career.

2019
Despite talks of a potential move up to Middleweight, Till stayed at Welterweight and faced Jorge Masvidal on 16 March 2019 at UFC Fight Night 147. Till lost the fight by knockout in the second round. Both participants were awarded a Fight of the Night bonus award.

Move to Middleweight
On 26 August, it was announced Till was returning to the middleweight division to face Kelvin Gastelum at UFC 244 on 2 November. He won the fight via split decision.

2020
Till faced Robert Whittaker on 26 July 2020 at UFC on ESPN: Whittaker vs. Till. He lost the fight via unanimous decision.

Till was scheduled to face Jack Hermansson on 5 December 2020 at UFC on ESPN 19. However, it was announced on 6 November that Till was forced to withdraw from the bout due to an injury. He was replaced by Kevin Holland, who was later replaced by Marvin Vettori. Till was forced to pull out from the match due to an undisclosed injury.

2021
Till was scheduled to face  Marvin Vettori on 10 April 2021, at UFC on ABC 2 On the week before the fight, Till was forced to pull out from the match due to a broken collarbone, and he was replaced by Kevin Holland.

Till faced Derek Brunson on 4 September 2021, at UFC Fight Night: Brunson vs. Till. He lost the fight via rear-naked choke submission in round three.

2022
Till was scheduled to face Jack Hermansson on 23 July 2022, at UFC Fight Night 208. He was replaced by Chris Curtis after being forced to withdraw from the bout due to an undisclosed injury.

Till faced Dricus du Plessis on 10 December 2022, at UFC 282. He lost the fight via submission in round three. This fight earned him the Fight of the Night award.

Departure
On 28 February 2023, it was revealed that Till was released from the UFC after requesting to be let go to pursue other interests.

Personal life
Till has three daughters.

Controversies 

On 18 April 2019, Till was arrested in Tenerife after trashing a hotel room when he was asked to leave, and for also stealing a taxi while the driver was loading his luggage into the trunk. Till and four other involved individuals were sentenced for a crime of damage and unauthorised use of a vehicle, and were fined approximately £10,000.

Till was penalized by Swedish police for driving under the influence of alcohol with over three times the legal limit in his system on 31 July 2022.

Championships and achievements

Mixed martial arts
Ultimate Fighting Championship
Performance of the Night (One time) 
Fight of the Night (Three times) 
Pundit Arena
2017 Breakthrough Fighter of the Year
MMADNA.nl
2017 Rising Star of the Year.

Muay Thai
European K1 Champion

Mixed martial arts record

|- 
|Loss
|align=center|18–5–1
|Dricus du Plessis
|Submission (face crank)
|UFC 282
|
|align=center|3
|align=center|2:43
|Las Vegas, Nevada, United States
|
|-
|Loss
|align=center|18–4–1
|Derek Brunson
|Submission (rear-naked choke)
|UFC Fight Night: Brunson vs. Till 
|
|align=center|3
|align=center|2:13
|Las Vegas, Nevada, United States
|
|-
|Loss 
|align=center|18–3–1
|Robert Whittaker
|Decision (unanimous)
|UFC on ESPN: Whittaker vs. Till 
|
|align=center|5
|align=center|5:00
|Abu Dhabi, United Arab Emirates
|
|-
|Win
|align=center|18–2–1
|Kelvin Gastelum
|Decision (split)
|UFC 244
|
|align=center|3
|align=center|5:00
|New York City, New York, United States
|
|-
|Loss
|align=center|17–2–1
|Jorge Masvidal
|KO (punches)
|UFC Fight Night: Till vs. Masvidal
|
|align=center|2
|align=center|3:05
|London, England
|
|-
|  Loss
|align=center|17–1–1
|Tyron Woodley
|Submission (brabo choke)
|UFC 228 
|
|align=center|2
|align=center|4:19
|Dallas, Texas, United States
|
|- 
|Win
|align=center|17–0–1
|Stephen Thompson
|Decision (unanimous)
|UFC Fight Night: Thompson vs. Till
|
|align=center|5
|align=center|5:00
|Liverpool, England
|
|-
|Win
|align=center|16–0–1
|Donald Cerrone
|TKO (punches)
|UFC Fight Night: Cowboy vs. Till
|
|align=center|1
|align=center|4:20
|Gdańsk, Poland
|
|-
|Win
|align=center| 15–0–1
|Bojan Veličković
|Decision (unanimous)
|UFC Fight Night: Volkov vs. Struve 
|
|align=center|3
|align=center|5:00
|Rotterdam, Netherlands
|
|-
| Win
| align=center| 14–0–1
| Jessin Ayari
| Decision (unanimous)
| UFC Fight Night: Gustafsson vs. Teixeira
| 
| align=center| 3 
| align=center| 5:00
| Stockholm, Sweden
| 
|-
| style="background-color: #c5d2ea; text-align:center"|Draw
| align=center| 
| Nicolas Dalby
| Draw (majority)
| UFC Fight Night: Holohan vs. Smolka
| 
| align=center| 3
| align=center| 5:00
| Dublin, Ireland
| 
|-
| Win
| align=center| 13–0
| Wendell de Oliveira
| KO (elbows)
| UFC Fight Night: Condit vs. Alves
| 
| align=center| 2
| align=center| 1:37
| Goiânia, Brazil
| 
|-
| Win
| align=center| 12–0
| Laerte Costa e Silva
| TKO (punches)
| MMA Sanda Combat
| 
| align=center| 4
| align=center| 2:01
| Apucarana, Brazil
| 
|-
| Win
| align=center| 11–0
| Guillermo Martinez Ayme
| Decision (unanimous)
| Arena Tour MMA
| 
| align=center| 3
| align=center| 5:00
| Buenos Aires, Argentina
| 
|-
| Win
| align=center| 10–0
| Sergio Matias
| Submission (toe hold)
| Aspera Fighting Championship 14
| 
| align=center| 2
| align=center| 3:05
| Lages, Brazil
|
|-
| Win
| align=center| 9–0
| Deivid Caubiack
| KO (punch)
| Aspera Fighting Championship 11
| 
| align=center| 1
| align=center| 1:35
| Curitibanos, Brazil
|
|-
| Win
| align=center| 8–0
| Cristiano Marquesotti
| Submission (inverted triangle choke)
| Curitibanos AMG Fight Champion
| 
| align=center| 1
| align=center| 4:45
| Curitibanos, Brazil
|
|-
| Win
| align=center| 7–0
| Edson Jairo da Silva
| TKO (retirement)
| Predador Campos Fight 2
| 
| align=center| 3
| align=center| 4:00
| Campos Novos, Brazil
| 
|-
| Win
| align=center| 6–0
| Alexandre Pereira
| KO (punch)
| Encontro dos Espartanos
| 
| align=center| 3
| align=center| 2:47
| Blumenau, Brazil 
| 
|-
| Win
| align=center| 5–0
| Pedro Keller de Souza
| KO (punch)
| Sparta MMA 7
| 
| align=center| 2
| align=center| 1:54
| Balneário Camboriú, Brazil
| 
|-
| Win
| align=center| 4–0
| Paulo Batista
| KO (punch)
| Sparta MMA 6
| 
| align=center| 1
| align=center| 1:24
| Itajaí, Brazil
| 
|-
| Win
| align=center| 3–0
|Junior Dietz
| TKO (punches)
| São João Super Fight: Forja de Campeões
| 
| align=center| 1
| align=center| 2:18
| São João Batista, Brazil
| 
|-
| Win
| align=center| 2–0
| Muriel Giassi
| TKO (punches)
| Tavares Combat 6
| 
| align=center| 2
| align=center| 2:50
| Palhoça, Brazil
| 
|-
| Win
| align=center| 1–0
|Luciano Oliveira Ribeiro
| Decision (unanimous)
| Sparta MMA 3
| 
| align=center| 3
| align=center| 5:00
| Balneário Camboriú, Brazil
|
|-

Pay-per-view bouts

See also
 List of male mixed martial artists

References

External links
 
 

Living people
British catch wrestlers
Criminals from Merseyside
English expatriates in Brazil
English male mixed martial artists
English Muay Thai practitioners
Martial artists from Liverpool
Ultimate Fighting Championship male fighters
Welterweight mixed martial artists
Mixed martial artists utilizing Muay Thai
Mixed martial artists utilizing catch wrestling
Mixed martial artists utilizing Luta Livre
1992 births